La Fortuna may refer to:

Places:
 La Fortuna, San Carlos, Costa Rica, a district and small city
 La Fortuna, Bagaces Cantón, Costa Rica, a district and village
 La Fortuna Waterfall (Costa Rica)
 Río de la Fortuna, a river in Bolivia

Other uses:
 La Fortuna (Metro Madrid), a station on Line 11
 La Fortuna (TV series), a drama first broadcast in 2021 in Spain
 Allegory of Fortune, sometimes also named La Fortuna, an oil painting created around 1658 or 1659 by Salvator Rosa

See also
 Fortuna (disambiguation)